Turn the Key Softly is a 1953 British drama film directed by Jack Lee and starring Yvonne Mitchell, Joan Collins, Kathleen Harrison, and Terence Morgan. Lee and producer Maurice Cowan also wrote the screenplay, based on the 1951 novel of the same title by John Brophy, dealing with the first 24 hours of freedom for three women released on probation from prison on the same morning. It was shot at Pinewood Studios and on location around London. The film's sets were designed by the art director Donald M. Ashton. It was released by Rank's General Film Distributors.

Plot
Three women are released from Holloway Prison in London. Monica Marsden is a well-bred young woman, led into crime by her smooth-talking lover David; Monica took the fall for a crime he masterminded. Stella Jarvis is a beautiful West End prostitute. Mrs Quilliam is a kindly elderly widow, who lived in poverty and was jailed for repeat shoplifting offences. Monica proposes that the three should meet up later for a fancy dinner, for which she will pay, to discuss how their first day of freedom has gone.

Monica goes to stay at her friend's flat and spends her morning job-hunting. Obtaining an office job despite her criminal record, she returns to the apartment and finds David waiting for her there. Although she is initially angry that he did not contact her once during her incarceration, he convinces her that the two of them can make a fresh start now that he is gainfully employed as a car salesman. He invites her to the theatre later that night.

Stella is engaged to Bob, an honest bus conductor who has patiently waited for her to get out of prison so they can marry. She resolves to change her ways and make him a good wife. He tells her that they can marry the following week when he can take time off from his work. He gives her three pounds to rent a room in Canonbury (since his landlady will not let Stella stay with him) and to buy herself food. He tells her to meet him that evening after his shift ends. She takes the bus to rent the room, but her route takes her through Leicester Square, where she visits her prostitute friends and squanders the three pounds on a pair of earrings.

Mrs Quilliam returns to her former room in the poor neighbourhood of Shepherd's Bush to her special friend, Johnny. Johnny turns out to be her beloved little dog, a Wire Fox Terrier, whom her neighbours have looked after. Mrs Quilliam has very little money. She and Johnny go to visit her daughter, Lila, who now lives in a nice suburban home with her husband and daughter. Lila, embarrassed by her mother's poverty and criminal record, is not happy to see her and coldly sends her away.

The three women, along with Johnny, dine at the Monte Christi, an elegant restaurant. Afterwards, Stella allows a businessman, George Jenkins, to pick her up on the street. They go drinking together, he gets drunk and Stella realises she is going to be late meeting Bob. Just before George falls asleep against a building, he tells Stella he does not like her new earrings and offers her money to buy a "decent" pair. She takes three pounds, returns George's wallet, then puts her earrings in his pocket, and hurries to meet Bob at Piccadilly Circus. She tells Bob she did not go to Canonbury, but that she has not done anything bad, showing him that she still has the three pounds. The two happily leave together.

Mrs Quilliam stops at a pub, where Johnny accidentally escapes out of the door into an unfamiliar area. She frantically hunts for Johnny, and upon seeing him, rushes into the street without looking. She is struck by a car and killed.

Monica goes to the theatre with David, only to learn that he plans to rob a safe in a building over the road and wants her to help him, after which they will flee the country with the stolen money. She does not want to be involved, but he forces her onto the roof and locks the door, making her wait for him while he climbs down a rope ladder and enters a nearby window to rob the safe. While she is waiting, she manages to find the key, unlock the door and slip back into the theatre, leaving David to be discovered by security and apprehended by police. Monica is sadly walking home when she sees the dead Mrs Quilliam being stretchered into an ambulance and learns what happened. She then sees Johnny whimpering nearby, and takes him home to start their new life together.

Cast
 Yvonne Mitchell as Monica Marsden
 Terence Morgan as David
 Joan Collins as Stella Jarvis
 Kathleen Harrison as Mrs Quilliam
 Thora Hird as Mrs Rowan
 Dorothy Alison as Joan
 Glyn Houston as Bob
 Geoffrey Keen as Mr Gregory
 Russell Waters as George Jenkins
 Clive Morton as Walters
 Richard Massingham as Bystander
 Hilda Fenemore as Mrs Quilliam's Daughter
 Fred Griffiths as Newspaper Seller
 Simone Silva as Marie
 Toke Townley as Prison Officer
 Vi Stevens as 	Barmaid
 Edward Evans as 	Commissionaire

Production
The film was based on a novel published in 1952. The censor, Arthur Watkyn, a playwright, made some suggestions for cuts to enable the film to be passed. Reportedly Kathleen Harrison had to spend two hours in the make up chair every morning.

This was Joan Collins's first film under a new contract she had signed with Rank. Terence Morgan was also under contract to Rank.

Reception
Turn the Key Softly received very positive reviews from contemporary critics, who noted with approval its realism and honesty; also its avoidance of the twin pitfalls in a storyline of this nature of either overly sentimentalising its characters or attempting to spice up proceedings with over-the-top melodrama or unnecessary plot twists and digressions. All three leading actresses were praised for their portrayals, with Harrison in particular singled out as giving a memorable and touching performance. Only a fall-back on coincidence as a plot device was mentioned as a minor weakness.

Variety said "there is an interesting idea in this new British production which just fails to come off."

New York Times critic A. W. wrote: "Turn the Key Softly...is pointedly realistic about its stigmatized principals. And, while this examination of the short courses of the lives of three ladies of varying degree after they have left London's Holloway Prison, is not precisely on a heroic scale, the producers have endowed the proceedings with compassion, sensitivity and a modicum of irony.  Credit Jack Lee and Maurice Cowan,...with keeping their heroines on the move without snarling this traffic in tales.  (They) see the ladies through with honest results. Yvonne Mitchell...brings attractiveness and understanding to the role. Joan Collins is properly lush and brassy as the Cockney charmer. However, Kathleen Harrison...contributes the film's top portrayal. She makes the loneliness of the poor and unwanted strikingly real." Film critic of the Pittsburgh Press, Henry Ward, said: "Turn the Key Softly is the kind of movie that apparently can only be made in Britain.  It is a warm, sympathetic sort of movie that is sentimental without being sticky or maudlin, a well-paced melodrama that never falls back on over-dramatics for effect."  He described Mitchell as "appealing", Collins as "excellent" and Harrison as "superb", concluding that the film "came to our town with a minimum of fanfare.  It doesn't need it.  It has a good story told with fine acting."

References

External links 
 
 
 
 

1953 films
1953 drama films
British black-and-white films
Films directed by Jack Lee
Films based on British novels
British prison drama films
Films shot at Pinewood Studios
Films shot in London
Films set in London
1950s prison films
1950s English-language films
1950s British films